Omid Norouzi (born 18 February 1986) is an Iranian wrestler. In 2010 he won the gold medal at the 2010 Asian Games and another gold medal in the Greco-Roman 60 kg category at the 2012 Summer Olympics in London.

References

External links

Omid Norouzi's match on YouTube
 

Living people
Iranian male sport wrestlers
Asian Games gold medalists for Iran
1986 births
People from Shiraz
Olympic wrestlers of Iran
Olympic gold medalists for Iran
Wrestlers at the 2012 Summer Olympics
Wrestlers at the 2016 Summer Olympics
Olympic medalists in wrestling
Asian Games medalists in wrestling
Wrestlers at the 2010 Asian Games
Medalists at the 2012 Summer Olympics
World Wrestling Championships medalists
Medalists at the 2010 Asian Games
Sportspeople from Fars province
20th-century Iranian people
21st-century Iranian people
World Wrestling Champions